Jasjeet Kaur Handa (born 20 December 1987, Shahabad Markanda, Haryana) is a member of the India women's national field hockey team. She hails from Haryana and played with the team when it won the Gold at the 2004 Women's Hockey Asia Cup. She was given the Arjuna award in 2010.

References 
Biography

1987 births
Living people
Indian female field hockey players
Punjabi people
Field hockey players from Haryana
Asian Games medalists in field hockey
Field hockey players at the 2006 Asian Games
Field hockey players at the 2010 Asian Games
Asian Games bronze medalists for India
Sportswomen from Haryana
Commonwealth Games medallists in field hockey
Commonwealth Games silver medallists for India
21st-century Indian women
21st-century Indian people
Medalists at the 2006 Asian Games
Field hockey players at the 2006 Commonwealth Games
Field hockey players at the 2010 Commonwealth Games
Recipients of the Arjuna Award
Medallists at the 2006 Commonwealth Games